Lake City is a city in Goodhue and Wabasha counties in the U.S. state of Minnesota.  It lies along Lake Pepin, a wide portion of the Mississippi River.  The population was 5,063 at the 2010 census.  Most of Lake City is located within Wabasha County with only a small portion in Goodhue County. Lake City is part of the Rochester, Minnesota Metropolitan Statistical Area.

History
Lac de Pleurs (Lake of Tears) was the name given to Lake Pepin by Father Louis Hennepin, who camped on the shore of the lake in 1680. He christened the large body of water Lac de Pleurs after observing his Sioux captors weeping near the lake over the death of a chief's son. The war party of Isanti Sioux had captured Hennepin and his two companions several miles south along the Mississippi and were camping near the lake on their return north to their Sioux villages near present-day Mille Lacs.

The first known settler was Jacob Boody, who arrived in 1853. In the years to follow, several explorers passed through this area. The town was platted in 1855.  The waters of Lake Pepin are deep enough to allow for a port, and in 1864 the Lake City town supervisors were given special powers by the State Legislature to create a port market for grain. Soon after, Lake City became noted as a profitable market for grain with the volume of trade in 1866 bringing in a little over a million and a half dollars.

Lake City became incorporated in 1872 and has become widely known for its attractive surroundings and bountiful fishing. The Sea Wing disaster occurred on July 13, 1890 when a strong squall line overturned the excursion vessel Sea Wing on Lake Pepin near Lake City. Over 200 people were aboard the vessel when it was overturned, and as a result 98 people drowned.

Water skiing was invented in Lake City by area resident, Ralph Samuelson, which he first performed in Lake Pepin during the summer of 1922.  To commemorate this event, Lake City has adopted the nickname "The Birthplace of Water Skiing" and holds an annual town festival, called Water Ski Days.  Water Ski Days typically includes three days of water skiing exhibitions, live music and a beer garden, a street carnival, sports tournaments, and Grand Parade; it is held annually during the last full-weekend in June. In 2020 Water Ski Days was slated to be held June 26-28 but was cancelled due to COVID-19. The festival that will be held in 2021 would have been the 50th, but will be the 49th because of the cancellation.

Lake City has three properties listed on the National Register of Historic Places: the 1872 James C. and Agnes M. Stout House, the 1899 Lake City City Hall, and the 1910 Williamson–Russell–Rahilly House.

Geography
U.S. Highways 61 and 63 are two of the main routes in the community.

Demographics

2010 census
As of the census of 2010, there were 5,063 people, 2,238 households, and 1,428 families living in the city. The racial makeup of the city was 99.3% White, 0.5% African American, 0.3% Native American, 0.8% Asian, 0.3% from other races, and 0.7% from two or more races. Hispanic or Latino of any race were 0.2% of the population.

There were 2,238 households, of which 24.4% had children under the age of 18 living with them, 51.3% were married couples living together, 8.3% had a female householder with no husband present, 4.2% had a male householder with no wife present, and 36.2% were non-families. 30.6% of all households were made up of individuals, and 15% had someone living alone who was 65 years of age or older. The average household size was 2.20 and the average family size was 2.72.

The median age in the city was 46.2 years. 20.2% of residents were under the age of 18; 6.7% were between the ages of 18 and 24; 21.8% were from 25 to 44; 27.7% were from 45 to 64; and 23.7% were 65 years of age or older. The gender makeup of the city was 48.1% male and 51.9% female.

2000 census
As of the census of 2000, there were 4,950 people, 2,131 households, and 1,402 families living in the city. The racial makeup of the city was 96.81% White, 0.63% African American, 0.40% Native American, 1.11% Asian, 0.28% from other races, and 0.77% from two or more races. Hispanic or Latino of any race were 2.22% of the population.

There were 2,131 households, out of which 26.7% had children under the age of 18 living with them, 56.0% were married couples living together, 7.4% had a female householder with no husband present, and 34.2% were non-families. 29.2% of all households were made up of individuals, and 14.7% had someone living alone who was 65 years of age or older.  The average household size was 2.30 and the average family size was 2.83.

In the city, the population was spread out, with 22.8% under the age of 18, 6.4% from 18 to 24, 26.1% from 25 to 44, 24.8% from 45 to 64, and 19.9% who were 65 years of age or older.  The median age was 41 years. For every 100 females, there were 93.1 males.  For every 100 females age 18 and over, there were 89.9 males.

The median income for a household in the city was $40,637, and the median income for a family was $47,146. Males had a median income of $35,321 versus $24,799 for females. The per capita income for the city was $20,944.  About 3.2% of families and 6.0% of the population were below the poverty line, including 7.7% of those under age 18 and 5.1% of those age 65 or over.

Education
Lake City is the home of Bluffview Elementary, a K–6 public elementary school, Lincoln High School for grades 7–12 (public), and St. John's Lutheran School, a K–8 Lutheran School of the WELS.  Previously, the town also was home to a Catholic School named St. Mary's.

City Services

Public Safety 
Lake City is Served by Full-time police and ambulance services that are city operated, and a paid on-call fire department serves the city, surrounding rural areas, and waters of Lake Pepin.

Library
The Lake City Public Library, located at 201 South High Street, is a member of Southeastern Libraries Cooperating, which "provide services and support to public, school, academic, and special libraries in an 11 county region of Southeastern Minnesota."

Media

Radio

Notable people
Randy Breuer, NBA Player
Fritz Cronin, NFL Player
Mary Pat Gleason, Actress
Taylor Heise, Ice hockey player
Lester Alexander Howatt, businessman and Minnesota state legislator
John Kobs, College Coach
Richard R. Lemke, farmer and Minnesota state legislator
Mark McKenzie, Movie Composer
Carl S. Nygren, farmer and Minnesota state legislator
Ralph Samuelson, Inventor of Water Skiing
Mark Tomforde, Mathematician
Joseph Kozlowski, NCAA D2 All-American

References

External links
City of Lake City
Lake City, MN – Chamber of Commerce

Cities in Wabasha County, Minnesota
Cities in Goodhue County, Minnesota
Cities in Minnesota
Minnesota populated places on the Mississippi River
Rochester metropolitan area, Minnesota